The Eli Radish Band was a Cleveland, Ohio-based music band in existence from 1968 to 1973. It was a pioneer of "outlaw country" and "alt-country" music. Deana Adams said in her 2003 rock history book Rock 'n' roll and the Cleveland connection: {{quote|They were country when country wasn’t cool. They were country rock when there was no such thing. Eli Radish practically defined the term “alternative.'” }}

The group signed with Capitol Records in 1969 and released its only album I Didn't Raise My Boy To Be A Soldier'' which featured updating of World War I and II era type patriotic/anti-war songs.

After recording for Capitol Records, then Olympia Records and even with rumors of a live concert recorded for Sun Records, the group got disbanded. However, various members still influence the entertainment business today.

Career
Eli Radish's founder and bassist Danny Sheridan continued to compose and produce songs for David Crosby, Scarlet Rivera, actress Amy Madigan and other CD, TV and film projects. He helped to launch his then girlfriend Nina Blackwood's MTV career, and Sheridan continues to produce her national radio shows and oversee her SiriusXM career. He co-hosted a talk show on 97.1 KLSX in Los Angeles and is a frequent speaker on various songwriter and music industry panels, often performing for charity events including Farm Aid and the Los Angeles Musician's Picnic. His own hard rock / blues based Bandaloo Doctors gave ex-wife Bonnie Bramlett’s career a comeback, and Sheridan has performed several acting parts on TV and in film.

Eli Radish incorporated the drumming skills of Skip Heil from South Euclid, Ohio in its inception, through its recording years and into the final days when members went their separate ways. Skip now resides in the wine country of northern California, continuing his songwriting activities. Rick "Muskrat" Kennedy plays acoustic solo shows at various resorts. Pedal steel player/guitarist Tom "The Foss" Foster tours the U.S. with several groups, and violinist "Little" Eva Karasik, who has recorded on a number of CDs including Jorma Kaukonen's Quah, now performs with the  San Francisco Opera.

In 1969 Eli Radish was signed with legendary rock and roll promoter and manager Roger Abramson. During these years throughout the 1970s, Roger Abramson included the band on concerts with many nationally known   groups from The Doors to Country Joe and the Fish.

When David Allan Coe began writing a string of hits that included “Would You Lay with Me (In a Field of Stone)” for a then teen-aged Tanya Tucker, and the tune, “Take This Job And Shove It”, Coe called on Sheridan to join him on his tours. Coe's hits include “You Never Even Call Me By My Name”, “Willie, Waylon, And Me” and "Longhaired Redneck".

The band broke up in 1973.

Discography
 I Didn't Raise My Boy To Be A Soldier (LP, Album)(1969)  Capitol Records

References

External links
Eli Radish Band

American alternative country groups
Musical groups established in 1969